Millersburg is a city in Linn County, Oregon,  United States. Millersburg originally was the name of a station on the Southern Pacific railroad line, which was named for a local farming family. The population was 1,329 at the 2010 census.

History 
Millersburg came into being in 1974, to prevent the city of Albany from attempting to extend its city limits to include where Wah Chang Corporation operated a zirconium processing plant for the United States Bureau of Mines.

Although now owned by Allegheny Technologies and until recently known as ATI Wah Chang, this processing plant is the city's largest employer.

Millersburg's infamous stench of past years, often attributed to the Wah Chang facility, is actually generated by the nearby Weyerhaeuser wood products processing mill. This has lent support to various attempts to close both plants. In August 2008, Weyerhauser sold the mill to International Paper. International Paper then closed the mill at the end of 2009, laying off 270 employees. As of summer 2010, the mill sits idle.

On July 22, 2010 the demolition of the paper mill, now owned by International Paper, began with the implosion of the number 4 recovery boiler.

In 2008, Peak Sun Silicon built a  polysilicon production facility in Millersburg. They currently employ about 50 people with plans to expand up to 500 jobs by 2013. However Peak Sun Silicon's land in Oregon was foreclosed on after they were unable to repay a loan from the Oregon Department of Energy.

Geography

Demographics

2010 census
As of the census of 2010, there were 1,329 people, 504 households, and 387 families living in the city. The racial makeup of the city was 91.9% White, 0.1% African American, 1.1% Native American, 1.4% Asian, 3.0% from other races, and 2.6% from two or more races. Hispanic or Latino of any race were 6.6% of the population.

There were 504 households, of which 34.1% had children under the age of 18 living with them, 65.3% were married couples living together, 7.5% had a female householder with no husband present, 4.0% had a male householder with no wife present, and 23.2% were non-families. 16.7% of all households were made up of individuals, and 6.4% had someone living alone who was 65 years of age or older. The average household size was 2.63 and the average family size was 2.92.

The median age in the city was 41.2 years. 23.6% of residents were under the age of 18; 5.2% were between the ages of 18 and 24; 27.2% were from 25 to 44; 30% were from 45 to 64; and 14.1% were 65 years of age or older. The gender makeup of the city was 50.6% male and 49.4% female.

2000 census
As of the census of 2000, there were 651 people, 263 households, and 179 families living in the city. The population density was 145.9 people per square mile (56.4/km). There were 288 housing units at an average density of 64.6 per square mile (24.9/km). The racial makeup of the city was 96.47% White, 0.77% Native American, 0.92% Asian, 0.15% from other races, and 1.69% from two or more races. Hispanic or Latino of any race were 2.76% of the population.

There were 263 households, out of which 30.4% had children under the age of 18 living with them, 59.3% were married couples living together, 6.1% had a female householder with no husband present, and 31.6% were non-families. 25.1% of all households were made up of individuals, and 8.4% had someone living alone who was 65 years of age or older. The average household size was 2.48 and the average family size was 2.98.

In the city, the population was spread out, with 24.4% under the age of 18, 6.0% from 18 to 24, 29.3% from 25 to 44, 29.0% from 45 to 64, and 11.2% who were 65 years of age or older. The median age was 37 years. For every 100 females, there were 105.4 males. For every 100 females age 18 and over, there were 103.3 males.

The median income for a household in the city was $35,469, and the median income for a family was $48,393. Males had a median income of $35,909 versus $25,625 for females. The per capita income for the city was $16,964. About 7.1% of families and 8.7% of the population were below the poverty line, including 5.0% of those under age 18 and 12.9% of those age 65 or over.

References

External links
Entry for Millersburg in the Oregon Blue Book

Cities in Oregon
Cities in Linn County, Oregon
1974 establishments in Oregon
Populated places on the Willamette River